Neil McGrath (born 4 December 1942) is a former British racing driver. He regularly competed in the British Saloon Car Championship. In 1985 he finished seventh overall and third in Class A. The cars he used were the Renault 5, Austin Metro and Rover Vitesse. He won the Renault 5 championship in 1974, 1975, 1976 and 1978. Class champion in a Renault Gordini in the Production Saloon Car Championship in 1979. Career race wins 136. Life long member of the BRDC

Racing record

Complete British Saloon Car Championship results
(key) (Races in bold indicate pole position; races in italics indicate fastest lap.)

† Events with 2 races staged for the different classes.

References

External links

1942 births
Living people
British Touring Car Championship drivers